Gurdwara Shri Nanakmatta Sahib is a village situated at Nanakmatta, between Khatima and Sitarganj on the Khatima-Panipat Road.  It is located 18 kilometres from Khatema and 12 kilometres from Sitarganj in the district of Udham Singh Nagar.

Educational institutions

A number of educational institutions are run here, including the Guru Nanak Balika Degree College, which is affiliated with Kumaon University, and the Guru Nanak Balika Degree Inter College and the Guru Nanak Inter College, both affiliated with the Uttar Pradesh Education Board.  Guru Nanak Primary School is run for boys and girls up to the fifth class.  These colleges have about 500 students and hostel accommodations are also provided.  Guru Nanak Academy, affiliated with the Central Board of Secondary Education, is also run.  It has 800 students and also provides hostel accommodations.

Gurdwaras in Uttarakhand
Sikh places
Udham Singh Nagar district